Ariadna inops is a spider species in the family Segestriidae. It is endemic to Portugal.

References

Segestriidae
Spiders described in 2011
Spiders of Europe